The second and final season of the Code Geass anime series, titled , is produced by Sunrise, Mainichi Broadcasting System, and Project Geass. The series was directed by Gorō Taniguchi who has also worked with Ichirō Ōkouchi on the script. The characters were conceived by Clamp and designed by Takahiro Kimura. R2 takes place a year after the events of the first series. The coup d'état by the Black Knights, led by the protagonist, Lelouch vi Britannia, ended in failure and resulted in Lelouch's capture and brainwashing. Since then, the coup has been referred to as the Black Rebellion.

R2 was first announced in the April 2007 edition of Newtype. Early screening for the first episode was held in March 2008 in Tokyo Dome City and Osaka Mido Hall. The series premiered on April 6, 2008 on MBS TV and Tokyo Broadcasting System Television; it was later broadcast on sixteen other stations. The third episode was partly leaked four days before its intended air date due to human error. The final episode aired on September 28, 2008. Bandai Visual encapsulated the series into nine volumes in DVD, Blu-ray, and Universal Media Disc formats; each volume contained a picture drama episode as a bonus. Bandai Visual later released a singular adaption of the series called Zero Requiem, and later released the series in a box collection.

The first episode premiered on Adult Swim on November 2, 2008, a week after the final episode of the first series was aired. Adult Swim restarted R2 in a new time slot by re-airing the first episode the week after and aired the final episode on June 7, 2009. Bandai Entertainment released the series in four DVD volumes and a DVD box between August 2009 and February 2012. During the 2013 Otakon, Funimation announced its acquisition of the series. In the United Kingdom, Kazé released the series as a DVD and Blu-ray box collection. In Australasia, Madman Entertainment released a single volume and a DVD and Blu-ray box collection. In anticipation for the DVD volume release, Madman streamed the episodes on a weekly basis beginning on October 27, 2009.

The episodes use four pieces of theme music: two opening and two ending themes. For the rest of the season, the opening theme is "World End" performed by Flow and the ending theme is  performed by Ali Project.

For the rest of the season, the opening theme is "Daydream Believer" by Flow and Orange Range, and the ending theme is "Z.E.R.O." by Blue Encount.



Episode list

Home media release

Japanese
Bandai Visual released the episodes in nine volumes in DVD, Blu-ray, and Universal Media Disc media format. The Zero Requiem release is a concentration of the series in one disc. Eventually, the nine volumes were released in a DVD box collection with a slated Blu-ray edition to be released.

Picture drama
The  episodes are still images and character voices used to tell a story. In Japan, a picture drama was added to every DVD or Blu-ray volume. In 2014, a Blu-ray box collection was released and contained a new picture drama episode.

English
In North America, Bandai Entertainment released the series in four DVD volumes; each volume release was accompanied with a limited edition version. Later, Bandai Entertainment released a box collection containing the four volumes.

In the United Kingdom, Kazé announced its acquisition of the series during the London MCM Expo in October 2012. They released the series as a DVD and Blu-ray box collection on March 11, 2013 with distribution by Manga Entertainment. In Australasia, Madman Entertainment released a single volume, then concluded with a DVD box collection on December 20, 2010. The Blu-ray version was released on June 16, 2013.

Notes

References

External links
 
 

2008 Japanese television seasons
R2